Mary Coyle (born November 5, 1954) is a Canadian politician serving as a senator from Nova Scotia. Coyle was appointed to the Senate on the advice of Prime Minister Justin Trudeau on December 4, 2017, and sits as a member of the Independent Senators Group (ISG).

Early life and education 
One of seven children, Coyle was born in Orillia, Ontario. Her family frequently moved around the province as her father was a travelling salesman and her mother a nurse. Coyle took in interest in politics in her youth. She invited Prime Minister Pierre Elliot Trudeau to visit her high school in Ottawa when she was head girl. Upon learning of Trudeau's habit of greeting women with a kiss, she found herself nervous he would kiss her upon his arrival – to her surprise, the prime minister did not kiss her, but she kissed him!

Coyle holds a Bachelor of Arts in Languages and Literature, a Master of Arts in Rural Planning and Development from the University of Guelph, and a diploma in French Language from the Université de Besançon.

Career 
After graduating, Coyle and her family moved to Botswana, where she worked in small business development. After returning to Canada, Coyle completed her master's degree, before moving to Indonesia to work as a rural development advisor. Her master's paper on small-scale businesses attracted the attention of Calmeadow, a microfinance firm; Coyle was approached to design a program for Indigenous peoples in Canada, resulting in the establishment of The First People’s Fund, which provides microfinance loans to First Nation and Métis communities, and helped create BancoSol in Bolivia, the world's first commercial microfinance bank.

After 10 years with Calmeadow, Coyle moved to Antigonish, Nova Scotia, in 1997 and became the director of the Coady International Institute at St. Francis Xavier University, where she developed First Nation and youth programs and created the Centre for Women’s Leadership.

She stepped away from The Coady after 13 years to work in Haiti and Indonesia, but would return to St. Francis Xavier in 2014 as the executive director of the Frank McKenna Centre for Leadership.

Political career 
Coyle was appointed to the Senate by Governor General Julie Payette on the advice of Prime Minister Justin Trudeau on December 4, 2017, alongside Mary Jane McCallum of Manitoba.

Personal life 
Coyle is married and has a husband and three daughters, Emilie, Lauren and Lindelwa. Her third daughter was born during her time in Botswana.

In 2016, Coyle underwent treatment for stage-three breast cancer.

References

Canadian senators from Nova Scotia
Women members of the Senate of Canada
Independent Canadian senators
Living people
1954 births
21st-century Canadian politicians
21st-century Canadian women politicians
Independent Senators Group